Steven Garrett Gregg (born November 3, 1955) is an American former competition swimmer. He won silver medals in the 200 m butterfly event at the 1976 Olympics, 1975 Pan American Games, and 1973 and 1978 world championships. After graduating from North Carolina State University, he defended a PhD in exercise biochemistry and physiology at University of California, Berkeley, and eventually settled in Chicago area with his family.

See also
 List of North Carolina State University people
 List of Olympic medalists in swimming (men)
 List of World Aquatics Championships medalists in swimming (men)

References

1955 births
Living people
American male butterfly swimmers
NC State Wolfpack men's swimmers
Olympic silver medalists for the United States in swimming
Sportspeople from Wilmington, Delaware
Swimmers at the 1975 Pan American Games
Swimmers at the 1976 Summer Olympics
World Aquatics Championships medalists in swimming
Medalists at the 1976 Summer Olympics
Pan American Games silver medalists for the United States
Pan American Games medalists in swimming
Medalists at the 1975 Pan American Games
20th-century American people
21st-century American people